The Order of Pope Pius IX, also referred as the Pian Order, is a papal order of knighthood originally founded by Pope Pius IV in 1560. Currently, it is the highest honor conferred by the Holy See (being the Order of Christ and the Order of the Golden Spur currently dormant).The awarding of the order fell into disuse and was re-instituted by Pope Pius IX as a continuation on 17 June 1847. 

The highest rank awarded by the Pope is the Collar of the Order, usually to Catholic heads of state on the occasion of official visits to the Holy See. The Grand Cross is the highest Papal award given to lay men and women, ordinarily given to resident Ambassadors accredited to the Holy See after two years in post and rarely to exceptional Catholics in the wider world for particular services, mainly in the international field and for outstanding deeds for Church and society.

The rank of Knight is almost never awarded, and when it happens, it is given in recognition of high-profile services rendered to the Holy See or directly to the person of the Pontiff, by Catholic faithful of distinguished status, almost always belonging to ancient European noble families.

The other two ranks (Commander and Commander with Star) are granted sparingly to lay Catholics, often of noble birth, for extraordinary merit or deeds for the Church and society. The order is awarded to Catholics and, on occasion and only for diplomatic reasons, to non-Catholics and non-Christians as well.

History of the Order

The Order was founded on 17 June 1847, by Pope Pius IX with the decree Romanis Pontificibus, placing it as the continuation of the ancient order established by Pope Pius IV with the bull Pii patris amplissimi on March 1559. These noble knights formed the lay court of the Roman Pontiff, being defined participants, since they "participated" in the life of the Pontiff, offering him an escort and often residing in the Apostolic Palace; they often shared the table with the Pontiff and accompanied him during his daily tasks.

The subsequent decree Cum Hominum Mentes of 17 June 1849, confirmed the ancient privilege of personal nobility through membership in the Pian Order, thus creating it the only ennobler of the Holy Apostolic See. With another decree dated 11 November 1856, the Roman Pontiff himself divided the Order into three classes: Knight Grand Cross, Commander, and Knight.

Pope Pius X reformed the Pontifical orders with the decree Multum ad excitandos of 7 February 1905, the new class of Commander with star (correspondent to the class of Grand Officer) was created.

The Piano Order was then reformed again by Pope Pius XII, with a Bull dated 11 November 1939, which suppressed the privilege of nobility. From the historical point of view, the Knighthood of the Grand Cross of the Pian Order has held the role that was of the Militia Aurata before the reform of Gregory XVI,  namely that of title of rank and ennobling of the Holy See from the sixteenth century to 1841.

Order of Classes

The Order comprises five classes:

Knight with the Collar: who wear a gold chain around their shoulders which is decorated with the papal tiara and two doves, and on the breast a large star. It is the highest active papal decoration, and is reserved for heads of state.
Knight / Dame Grand Cross (GCPO): who wear a wide dark blue silk ribbon (sash) bordered with red which extends saltire-wise from the left shoulder to the right side where the insignia of the order is suspended by a rosette, and on the breast a large diamond-studded star. It is commonly awarded to the ambassadors accredited to the Holy See.
Knight / Dame Commander with Star (KC*PO / DC*PO): who in addition to the badge wear a star of smaller design than that of Knights of the Grand Cross on the breast.
Knight / Dame Commander (KCPO / DCPO): who wear the decoration at the neck.
Knight / Dame (KPO / DPO): who wear the star on the left breast.

Insignia and uniform
The decoration is a regular octagram made of blue enamel, the spaces between the rays filled with gold flames. On the white medallion in the center the name of the founder surrounded by the words Virtuti et Merito ("Virtue and Merit") is engraved.  The reverse side is the same save for the substitution of Anno 1847 for Pius IX. The rarely worn official uniform consists of an elaborately embroidered dark blue evening coat with golden epaulettes, white trousers, and a white-plumed bicorne.

Knights with the Collar wear a gold decorated chain around the neck, and a star on the left side of the breast; Knights Grand Cross wear a sash and a star on the left side of the breast; Commanders wear a cross around the neck; and Knights wear a smaller cross on the left breast of the uniform:

Notable members

Royal houses and nobility
Juan Carlos I, former King of Spain, first and honorary canon of the Basilica of Saint Mary Major, with Collar
Fra Andrew Bertie, 78th Prince and Grand Master of the Sovereign Military Order of Malta, with Collar
Henri, Grand Duke of Luxembourg, with Collar
Albert II, King of the Belgians, with Collar
Carl XVI Gustaf, King of Sweden, with Collar
Haile Selassie I, Emperor of Ethiopia
Mwambutsa IV, King of Burundi
Gabriel García Moreno y Morán de Butrón, former President of Ecuador, with Collar
Miles Stapleton Fitzalan-Howard, 17th Duke of Norfolk, Earl Marshal, Premier Duke of England
Count Herman van Rompuy, former Prime minister of Belgium
Count Charles de Broqueville, former Prime minister of Belgium.
Count Paul de Smet de Naeyer, former Prime minister of Belgium
Count Charles Woeste, Belgian Minister

Heads of State and Politicians
 Nicos Anastasiades, current President of Cyprus
 Sergio Mattarella, current President of Italy
 Marcelo Rebelo de Sousa, current President of Portugal 
 Giorgio Napolitano, former President of Italy 
 Carlo Azeglio Ciampi, former President of Italy 
 Oscar Luigi Scalfaro, former President of Italy 
 Francesco Cossiga, former President of Italy 
 Jacques Chirac, former President of France 
 Marco Fidel Suárez, former President of Colombia 
 Konstantinos Stephanopoulos, former President of Greece 
 Diosdado Macapagal, former President of the Philippines
 Juscelino Kubitschek, former President of Brazil
 Carlos Menem, former President of Argentina
 Demetris Christofias, former President of Cyprus 
 Saitō Makoto, former Prime Minister of Japan
 Władysław Grabski, former Prime Minister of Poland
 George Papandreou, former Prime Minister of Greece
 Franz Von Papen, former Vice-Chancellor of Germany
 Juan Vicente Gómez, former President of Venezuela
 Sukarno, former President of Indonesia
 W.T. Cosgrave, former Taoiseach of Ireland

Diplomats to the Holy See
 Callista Gingrich, former United States Ambassador to the Holy See
 Mercedes Arrastia Tuason, former Philippine Ambassador to the Holy See
 William A. Wilson, former United States Ambassador to the Holy See
 Frank Shakespeare, former United States Ambassador to the Holy See
 Thomas Patrick Melady, former United States Ambassador to the Holy See
 Raymond Flynn, former Mayor of Boston, Massachusetts, former Ambassador to the Holy See
 Lindy Boggs, former Member of Congress, former Ambassador to the Holy See
 Khétévane Bagration de Moukhrani, former Georgian Ambassador to the Holy See
 Tim Fischer, former Australian Deputy Prime Minister and former Australian Ambassador to the Holy See

Other notable members

Jean-Pierre Mazery, Grand Chancellor of the Sovereign Military Order of Malta
 Virgil C. Dechant, former vice-president for the Vatican Bank & Supreme Knight of the Knights of Columbus

See also
Papal Orders of Knighthood

References

External links

Association of Papal Orders in Great Britain 
Association of Papal Orders in Great Britain of Pius IX, Saint Gregory and Saint Sylvester: The Pontifical Order of Pius IX
The Knights of Christ's Mercy: Order of Pius IX
National Association of Papal Honorees: Roll of US Members of the Order of Pius IX

 
Awards established in 1847
1847 establishments in the Papal States